Riceford Creek is a stream in Minnesota.

The creek is named after Minnesota Territory politician Henry Mower Rice, who forded this creek in 1856.

See also
List of rivers of Minnesota

References

Rivers of Fillmore County, Minnesota
Rivers of Houston County, Minnesota
Rivers of Minnesota
Southern Minnesota trout streams
Driftless Area